Aegomorphus lanei is a species of beetle in the family Cerambycidae. It was described by Marinoni and Martins in 1978.

References

Aegomorphus
Beetles described in 1978